Miguel Arrobas (born 30 September 1974) is a Portuguese backstroke swimmer. He competed in two events at the 1992 Summer Olympics.

References

External links
 

1974 births
Living people
Portuguese male backstroke swimmers
Olympic swimmers of Portugal
Swimmers at the 1992 Summer Olympics